Dalahu County (Ŝāhrestāne Dālāhu) is in Kermanshah province, Iran. The capital of the county is the city of Kerend-e Gharb. It was separated from Eslamabad-e Gharb County in 2004. At the 2006 census, the county's population was 42,310 in 9,665 households. The following census in 2011 counted 39,837 people in 10,364 households. At the 2016 census, the county's population was 35,987 in 10,266 households.

Administrative divisions

The population history and structural changes of Dalahu County's administrative divisions over three consecutive censuses are shown in the following table. The latest census shows two districts, five rural districts, and three cities.

See also
Sarpol-e Zahab County
Qasr-e Shirin County

References

 

Counties of Kermanshah Province